4 Runner may refer to:

Toyota 4Runner, a make of car
4 Runner, a country music group
4 Runner (album), this group's debut album